Stanković is a common surname derived from the South Slavic masculine given name Stanko. Stanković is the eighth most frequent surname in Serbia, and is also common in Croatia, with 2,842 carriers (2011 census). It may also be transliterated as Stankovich or Stankovych or Stankovic.

Geographical distribution
As of 2014, 81.6% of all known bearers of the surname Stanković were residents of Serbia (frequency 1:175), 8.4% of Bosnia and Herzegovina (1:840), 3.4% of Croatia (1:2,457), 3.2% of Kosovo (1:1,147) and 2.4% of Montenegro (1:529).

In Serbia, the frequency of the surname was higher than national average (1:175) in the following regions:
 1. Jablanica District (1:36)
 2. Pčinja District (1:55)
 3. Nišava District (1:63)
 4. Toplica District (1:74)
 5. Zaječar District (1:91)
 6. Pirot District (1:91)
 7. Podunavlje District (1:138)
 8. Bor District (1:139)
 9. Braničevo District (1:142)
 10. Pomoravlje District (1:156)

People
Aca Stanković (born 1967), Serbian pole vaulter
Boris Stankovich (born 1980), New Zealand rugby union player
Borisav Stanković (1876–1927), Serbian realist writer
Borislav Stanković (1925–2020), Serbian basketball administrator, longtime FIBA chairman, retired basketball player
Branko Stanković (1921–2002), Serbian footballer and coach
Dejan Stanković (football manager) (born 1957) serbian football player and manager with austrian citizenship
Dejan Stanković (born 1978), Serbian footballer
Dejan Stankovic (beach soccer) (born 1985), Swiss beach footballer of Serbian origin
Eliza Stankovich (born 1981), Australian wheelchair racer
Jon Gorenc Stanković (born 1996), Slovenian footballer
Jovan Stanković (born 1971), Serbian footballer
Kornelije Stanković (1831–1865), Serbian composer
Marko Stankovic (born 1986), Austrian footballer
Mato Stanković (born 1970), Croatian futsal coach
Milan Stanković (born 1987), Serbian singer
Milić Stanković, birth name of painter Milić od Mačve
Milovan Stanković (born 1969), Serbian writer
Vasyl Stankovych (born 1946), Soviet fencer
Yevhen Stankovych (born 1942), Ukrainian composer
Zoran Stanković (born 1954), doctor and politician, Serbian Minister of Defense (2005–2007)

References

See also
 

Serbian surnames
Croatian surnames
Patronymic surnames
Surnames from given names